Larry Stuart Roy Johnston (born July 20, 1943) is a Canadian former professional ice hockey defenceman who played for over 14 years in seven different hockey leagues. He spent the most time with the Springfield Indians/Kings of the American Hockey League and the Detroit Red Wings of the National Hockey League, where he served a short term as captain.

Playing career

Minor league hockey
The Toronto Maple Leafs drafted Johnston in 1965. Johnston had spent the previous two seasons playing for the Johnstown Jets of the EHL and the Tulsa Oilers of the Central Hockey League (CHL). Johnston was traded to the American Hockey League's Springfield Indians for Bruce Gamble. The hockey club was purchased by the Los Angeles Kings of the National Hockey League (NHL) and renamed the Springfield Kings. In the 1967–68 season he made four appearances with the Los Angeles Kings, picking up four penalty minutes and a −7 plus/minus rating. He wouldn't reach the NHL again for three more seasons.

In 1969, he was named the most valuable player in Springfield and also led the AHL in penalty minutes in 1968 and 1969. With his increased value, Johnston was traded by Los Angeles to the Detroit Red Wings along with Dale Rolfe and Gary Croteau for Garry Monahan, Brian Gibbons and Matt Ravlich on February 20, 1970. He started in the CHL with the Fort Worth Wings before quickly moving back up to the AHL with the Baltimore Clippers.

Reaching the NHL
The following season, Johnston played 12 games with the Tidewater Wings of the AHL before he was brought up to the Detroit Red Wings to finish out the 1971–72 season. After ten seasons in the minor leagues, Johnston finally found his place in the NHL with Detroit. He would finish his first season with a +20 rating, 24 points and 111 penalty minutes. He was a bright spot on a team that was losing its direction after the Stanley Cup-winning seasons of the 1950s. He played three seasons in Detroit before signing with the Michigan Stags of the WHA in July 1974 and played there until a rash of injuries shut him down. The Stags transferred to Baltimore during the 1974–75 season becoming the Baltimore Blades.

According to the book Icing On The Plains: The Rough Ride of Kansas City's NHL Scouts (pp. 137-138, Troy Treasure, Balboa Press), when the Michigan franchise moved to Baltimore to be operated by the WHA, Johnston claimed the league failed to properly abide by the terms of his contract. The WHA countered Johnston was not putting forth proper effort on the ice.

"Johnston didn't want to play here and he wasn't performing up to expectations," Blades executive director Skip Feldman told the Kansas City Star. "He was just going through the motions. His release was by mutual agreement." According to published reports, Johnston's agent Bob Wolfe told Baltimore media his client had effectively bought out the remainder of his contract for what he was owed for the rest of the season.  

The Kansas City Scouts acquired Johnston on March 1, 1975 in exchange for an undetermined amount of cash to add muscle and organization to their young defence. Johnston signed for the remainder of the 1974-75 season and the following year. Johnston had one full season with Kansas City in 1975–76 before the franchise relocated to Denver, Colorado, as the Colorado Rockies. Johnston suited up for 25 games in the 1976–77 season, which were his last in the NHL.

Johnston played the remainder of that season for the Maine Nordiques of the North American Hockey League and retired in 1977.

Career statistics

References

External links

1943 births
Living people
Baltimore Blades players
Baltimore Clippers players
Canadian expatriate ice hockey players in the United States
Canadian ice hockey defencemen
Colorado Rockies (NHL) players
Detroit Red Wings captains
Detroit Red Wings players
Fort Worth Wings players
Ice hockey people from Ontario
Johnstown Jets players
Kansas City Scouts players
Los Angeles Kings players
Maine Nordiques players
Michigan Stags players
Sportspeople from Kitchener, Ontario
Springfield Indians players
Springfield Kings players
Tulsa Oilers (1964–1984) players